The Linwood Plantation is a plantation with a historic house in Tensas Parish, Louisiana, United States. The manager's house was built in 1875. It has been listed on the National Register of Historic Places since September 23, 1994.

References

Houses on the National Register of Historic Places in Louisiana
Greek Revival architecture in Louisiana
Houses completed in 1875
Buildings and structures in Tensas Parish, Louisiana
Plantations in Louisiana